The Skin I'm In is a realistic fiction novel written by Sharon G. Flake. It was published by Hyperion Books on January 3, 2000. It depicts the story of seventh-grader Maleeka Madison who has low self-esteem because of her dark brown skin color. The novel's themes include self-love, self-esteem, the power of friendship, bullying and body image. The anniversary edition was released in October 2018.  In 2021, Sharon Flake published a sister novel, The Life I'm In, following the character Charlese Jones.

Summary

Maleeka is a seventh-grader who struggles with her body image due to both society and her classmates' colorist bullying. Throughout the novel, Maleeka struggles and ultimately succeeds in standing up for herself and coming to love the skin she's in. Maleeka was born on January 3, 2008, in Frankfort, Kentucky. After the terrible death of her father at age 10, her mother deals with her depression by sewing clothes for her daughter. But she cannot sew at all and people make fun of her for it.

Main characters

 Maleeka Madison - A poor African-American girl who feels she is unpopular at her middle school because of her dark skin color and teenage clothes. Maleeka learns to come to terms with the skin she is in.
Charlese Jones (Char) - The antagonist of the story and main character of The Life I'm In. She is a fast-talking trouble making girl who is one of Maleeka's "friends." She lends Maleeka her clothes in exchange for Maleeka doing her homework.
Miss Saunders - Maleeka's English teacher. She has a skin disorder on her face (most likely vitiligo) that she says no one was able to get rid of. She is confident and is essentially what Maleeka dreams of being.   
Caleb - Maleeka's love interest. He's a caring boy who is dedicated to school and doesn't care about what people think about him. He's a little shy when it comes to Maleeka. 
Raina and Raise - Charlese's "sidekicks" who agree with and go along with everything Char does.
Momma/ Mrs. Madison (Maleeka's mother) - Maleeka's loving mother. Though devastated after the death of her husband, Mrs. Madison still pushes Maleeka to do well in school and tries to relieve some of her depression through sewing Maleeka clothes. Some people believe that she is crazy although Maleeka believes that she is a very smart and bright mother.
John-John - Maleeka's tormentor since 2nd grade.

Awards
 Coretta Scott King/John Steptoe Award for New Talent
 Publishers Weekly Author to Watch
 New York Public Library Top Ten Book for the Teen Age
 YALSA Best Books for Young Adult Readers
 YALSA Quick Picks for Reluctant Readers
 Texas Lonestar Reading List
 Bank Street College of Education Best Children’s Books of the Year
 YWCA Racial Justice Award
 Detroit Free Library Author of the Year Award
 Starred Review in Publishers Weekly

References

External links
Sharon Flake official website
Sharon Flake official website
All Readers

 American young adult novels
2000 American novels
 African-American novels